Katerina Didaskalou (Greek: Κατερίνα Διδασκάλου) (born 29 December 1960 in Athens, Greece) is a Greek theatre, stage, television and film actress. She studied dramatic arts and philosophy in Athens and went on to study cinema and theater at Columbia University, on an Onassis Foundation scholarship. In 2005, she starred in Eric Rohmer's Triple Agent, as "Arsinoe", the Greek wife of a retired general of the Tsarist army. She was in the 1st and 4th seasons of the Greek soap opera Erotas ("Love") and in the US-produced film Captain Corelli's Mandolin.

References

External links
 

1960 births
Living people
Actresses from Athens
Greek television actresses
Greek film actresses
Greek stage actresses
Columbia University School of the Arts alumni